is a Japanese former competitive figure skater. She is the 2010 Triglav Trophy champion and 2009 Merano Cup silver medalist. Muramoto was coached by Mie Hamada and Yamato Tamura. After retiring from competition, she became a coach.

She is the older sister of ice dancer Kana Muramoto.

Programs

Competitive highlights
JGP: Junior Grand Prix

References

External links 
 

Japanese female single skaters
1990 births
Living people
Kansai University alumni
Sportspeople from Hyōgo Prefecture
People from Akashi, Hyōgo